Harry Daniel Baker (born 1937) was a Canadian politician. He served in the Legislative Assembly of Saskatchewan from 1982 to 1991, as a Progressive Conservative member for the constituency of Biggar.

References

Progressive Conservative Party of Saskatchewan MLAs
1937 births
Living people